was the Governor of Hiroshima Prefecture from October 1945 to 1950. 

Kusunose was appointed to his position as governor at a time when the city of Hiroshima was in destruction following the first use of the nuclear bomb in August 1945. He was appointed by the Japanese government to fill that position upon the expiration of the appointment of his predecessor Genshin Takano. In 1947 he was elected to the same position and thus became the first elected governor of Hiroshima Prefecture. 

As part of his efforts to reconstruct the city, he held on February 22, 1946, a conference on the future of Hiroshima with the participation of historian Yoshirō Saeki, novelist Yoko Ota, deputy Mayor of Kure Tomiko Koura and others. 
As governor, he followed a policy of refraining from antagonizing the US military authorities in control of Hiroshima at the time, and supported the suppression by US and Australian troops of the workers' strike in June 1949 in protest of the dismissal of workers of Nihon Seiko company, an event known as the Nikko Incident.

In 1950, he resigned his post as governor to run for a vacant seat in the House of Councillors. He was elected, and served until losing in the 1953 election. During his term in the House of Councillors, in 1952, was one of the initiators of a visit of sympathy by a group of survivors of the atomic attack on Hiroshima to the war criminals kept at Sugamo Prison.

Died in 1988 of heart failure.

References 
Yoshiteru Kosakai, Hiroshima Peace Reader (Hiroshima, 1980)

Notes

1899 births
1988 deaths
People from Hiroshima
Hitotsubashi University alumni
Governors of Hiroshima
Members of the House of Councillors (Japan)